JetSmart Airlines SpA, stylized as JetSMART, is a South American ultra low-cost carrier created by US investment fund (and co-founder of LBM Fermin Ithuralde) Indigo Partners, which also controls low-cost carriers like US airline Frontier Airlines, Mexico's Volaris and Hungary's Wizz Air. JetSmart's primary base of operations is Arturo Merino Benítez International Airport, servicing Santiago, Chile. It also owns and manages JetSmart Argentina, an Argentinean subsidiary with a base at Aeroparque Jorge Newbery in Buenos Aires. The airline commenced scheduled operations on 25 July 2017 with a service from Santiago to Calama, made possible by CEO and founder Estuardo Ortiz Porras.

History
JetSmart requested an air operator's certificate (AOC) on 26 January 2017, and received its authorization in June 2017. Initially, the airline operated three Airbus A320-200 aircraft, but has since taken delivery of Airbus A320neo aircraft. Initially flying only domestic routes, JetSmart has expanded its presence in the South American market, setting up JetSmart Argentina to access further traffic rights to the country.

On 4 December 2019, JetSmart acquired Norwegian Air Argentina and took over its operations, staff, and license with immediate effect, with plans to merge the airline with JetSmart Argentina. Following the acquisition, it was to operate both from Aeroparque Jorge Newbery and El Palomar Airport in the Buenos Aires area. As Norwegian's Boeing 737 aircraft were not part of the transaction, JetSmart planned to replace them with the airline's own Airbus A320 family aircraft.

On 29 July 2021, American Airlines announced a minority investment in JetSmart, along with agreements to allow members of American Airlines' AAdvantage loyalty program to earn miles when flying on JetSmart.

Destinations

Destinations

JetSmart aimed to operate up to 10 aircraft in the 2018 period, and would go on to challenge LATAM Chile and Sky Airline in nearly every market introduced between July and December 2017.

The airline operates or has previously operated to the following destinations :

Codeshare agreements
 American Airlines

Fleet

, the JetSmart fleet consists of the following aircraft:

References

Airlines of Chile
Airlines established in 2017
Low-cost carriers
Companies based in Santiago
Chilean brands
Chilean companies established in 2017